The Racing Academy and Centre of Education (RACE) is a jockey training school at the Irish National Stud near Kildare, Ireland. Its Trainee Jockey Course is a foundation course in race riding and stable work, taught in a 42-week residential program. Students typically go on to either jockey apprenticeships or stable work after completing the course. Johnny Murtagh and Cathy Gannon are among those who have gone on to success as racing jockeys after taking the Trainee Jockey Course. RACE also offers other training and certification in race riding, the care of horses and racehorse training, including riding courses for international students. The Irish School of Farriery run by the Irish Farriery Authority is located in a purpose-built building on the RACE campus, and several other organisations involved in the equine sector are also located here.

History
RACE was founded in 1973, as a social project to offer new entrants to the racing profession support as apprentices. Over the next forty years it expanded into providing education and training for jockeys, stable staff, racehorse breeders, racehorse trainers and other people involved in the thoroughbred industry.

It is located in Curragh House, formerly the home of William Hall-Walker, an important figure in thoroughbred racehorse breeding. The campus has extensive landscaped grounds and is located near the Curragh Racecourse and many training establishments. RACE is a not-for-profit educational establishment and registered charity and is supported by the racing industry and various state agencies. Students from over thirty countries have been trained here, and many have moved on to make considerable contributions to the global racing sector. The  chairman is trainer John Oxx.

References

External links
 RACE official website

Education in County Kildare
Sport in County Kildare
Horse racing in Ireland
Educational institutions established in 1973
1973 establishments in Ireland
Jockey schools